"Somebody" is a song by American music production duo the Chainsmokers, featuring guest vocals from Drew Love of American R&B duo THEY. Written by Andrew Taggart, Emily Warren, Drew Love and produced by the Chainsmokers, it was released by Disruptor Records and Columbia Records on April 20, 2018, as the fourth single from the Chainsmokers' second studio album, Sick Boy.

Release and composition
The Chainsmokers revealed the single artwork and announced its release date on April 18, 2018. "Somebody" is a tropical number that combines elements of pop, R&B and EDM. Featuring "mournful keys and atmospheric synths", the song consists of a "bass-heavy drop". Billboards Kat Bein called it "a slow-cooker coated with R&B tones and twinkling accents reminiscent of earlier works by the Chainsmokers". Lyrically, the song "talks about the struggle and importance of staying true to yourself whilst everyone else around you is focused on surrounding themselves with material objects".

Music video
The accompanying music video was directed by Jim Batt and Kim Boekbinder, and it features time-lapsed water color paintings from Molly Crabapple. The Chainsmokers said of the video on Twitter: "It tells the story of temptation which we all deal with in our ways but often consumes us."

Critical reception
Mike Nied of Idolator regarded the song as "the pair's strongest release in 2018 and boasts one of their most restrained productions to date". He noticed the song of being more introspective compared to the duo's previous work, writing that "[Taggart's] voice effortlessly compliments their featured vocalist". Chantilly Post of HotNewHipHop opined that the song "shows [the Chainsmokers'] talent for creating chilled out, introspective tunes".

Credits and personnel
Credits adapted from Tidal.
 Alex Pall – production, composition, piano
 Andrew Taggart - production, composition, guitarra, voz
 Jordan Stilwell – mix engineering, record engineering
 Randy Merrill – master engineering

Charts

Weekly charts

Year-end charts

Certifications

References

2018 singles
2018 songs
Columbia Records singles
Songs written by Andrew Taggart
Songs written by Emily Warren
The Chainsmokers songs
2010s ballads